Curacoites is a genus of ammonites which existed during the early Barremian of what is now Argentina. It was described by Beatriz Aguirre-Urreta and Peter F. Rawson in 2012, and the type species is C. rotundus.

References

Cretaceous ammonites